Big Top Academy is a musical children's TV show, that aired on TVO Kids throughout 2018 and 2019. The show stars a lengthy children's ensemble, including Drew Davis, Cameron Andres, Ava Ro, Liam Patenaude, Madison Brydges, Ellowyn Stanton, Riley O'Donnell, Samson Boldizar, Ana Elizaga Tecuapetla and Carson MacCormac.

The 52 episodes of the show started airing on June 10, 2018 on TVO Kids, and has also aired on Pop. The show can also be streamed on Hulu in the United States and Pop Player in the United Kingdom.

During the COVID-19 pandemic, Big Top Academy: School's Out Edition started production, filming from the cast's houses. This 26 episodes of the reboot aired on TVO Kids and Pop Player, in 2020.

Plot 
In a circus arts boarding school, an extraordinary group of young acrobats who dream of becoming professional circus artists, perform stunts, tricks and performances, but no one could imagine the crazy mysteries they'll find on the way, whether it is secret rooms and books, amulets or spies.

Cast 

 Drew Davis as Nicholas
 Cameron Andres as Maxwell
 Ava Ro as Ella
 Liam Patenaude as Chase
 Madison Brydges as April
 Ellowyn Stanton as Phoenix
 Riley O'Donnell as Celeste
 Samson Boldizar as Axel
 Marc Trottier as Sir Rayne
 Krin Haglund as Ms. Martel
 Michael Barbuto as Nicky Zolta
 Carson MacCormac as young Nicky Zolta
 Michelle Argyris as Miss G.
 Ana Elizaga Tecuapetla as Rosa

Release 
TVO Kids released the first episode of Big Top Academy on June 10, 2018, along with the 52 episodes airing throughout the year, into 2019. In 2019, Pop, a free-to-air British television channel in the UK, received distribution rights to the show and started airing it in the United Kingdom. All episodes of the show are also available to stream on Hulu.

In 2020, Apartment 11 Productions started production on a reboot filmed in the homes of the cast and surrounding areas, due to the COVID-19 pandemic, which aired on Pop Player (then called Pop Fun) and TVO Kids.

Reception 

The show received multiple awards and nominations for the cast, and the show itself was nominated at the Canadian Screen Award in 2020 for Best Children’s or Youth Fiction Program or Series, and was also nominated at the Youth Media Alliance Award of Excellence in 2019 for the Best Live Action Scripted Ages 6-9.

References

External links 

2010s Canadian children's television series
2018 Canadian television series debuts
Television series about teenagers
TVO original programming